Umra railway station is a medium-size railway station, located in Udaipur district, Rajasthan, India, besides the main Udaipur City railway station. Its code is UMRA. It serves Umarda village. It is under the administrative control of North Western Railway of Indian Railways.

Umra railway station is part of the Ahmedabad–Udaipur line, which is undergoing gauge conversion, from metre to broad gauge.

References

See also
 Udaipur
 Udaipur Airport
 Udaipur City Bus Depot

Ajmer railway division
Railway stations in Udaipur district